Valley River is a tributary of the Hiwassee River in Cherokee County, North Carolina.

Valley River may also refer to:

 Valley River (Manitoba), a river in Southwestern Manitoba, Canada
 Valley River (Minnesota), a river of Minnesota
 Valley River 63A, Manitoba, Canada
 Valley River Center, a shopping mall in Eugene, Oregon

See also
 Tygart Valley River, a tributary of the Monongahela River, West Virginia
 Vallée River, a tributary of the Chaudière River, Ontario, Canada
 River Valley (disambiguation)